Petre Tobă (born 18 June 1964) is a Romanian politician who served as Minister of Internal Affairs of Romania in the Cioloș Cabinet from 17 November 2015 to 1 September 2016.

Born in Bucharest, he studied engineering at the Technical University of Civil Engineering of Bucharest from 1985 to 1989. In 2009 he became Inspector General of the Romanian Police.

His awards include the Order of the Star of Romania, Knight class and the National Order of Faithful Service, Officer class, and the National Order of Merit, Knight class.

References

1964 births
Living people
Politicians from Bucharest
Carol I National Defence University alumni
Romanian Ministers of Interior
Knights of the Order of the Star of Romania
Recipients of the National Order of Faithful Service
Recipients of the National Order of Merit (Romania)